William Mason may refer to:

William Mason (gunsmith) (1837–1913), American engineer and inventor working for Remington, Colt, and Winchester
William Mason (composer) (1829–1908), American composer and pianist
William Mason (locomotive builder) (1808–1883), built locomotives at his Mason Machine Works between 1853 and 1889, including:
William Mason (locomotive), steam locomotive built by the aforementioned builder for the Baltimore and Ohio Railroad and later named in his honor
William Mason (architect) (1810–1897), architect and first mayor of Dunedin, New Zealand
William Mason (stenographer) (fl. 1672–1709), English writing-master
William Mason (poet) (1724–1797), English poet, editor and gardener
William Mason (religious writer) (1719–1791), Calvinist author and editor of the Gospel Magazine
William Mason (New York politician) (1786–1860), United States Representative from New York
William D. Mason (born 1959), prosecutor from Cuyahoga County, Ohio
William E. Mason (American politician) (1850–1921), U.S. Representative and Senator from Illinois
William E. Mason (Canadian politician) (1866–1951), former mayor of Regina, Saskatchewan, Canada
William E. Mason (East St. Louis mayor), former mayor of East Saint Louis, Illinois
William Mason (1757–1818), American militiaman in the American Revolutionary War and Virginia planter
William Temple Thomson Mason (1782–1862), Virginia farmer, businessman and politician
William Mason, 1st Baron Blackford (1862–1947), British politician and public servant
William Shaw Mason (1774–1853), statistician and bibliographer
William Mason (cricketer) (1811–1865), English cricketer
William Pinckney Mason (1843–1922), lieutenant in the Confederate States Navy
William S. Mason (1832–1899), mayor of Portland, Oregon, 1891–1894 and 1898–1899
William H. Mason, inventor of masonite
William Mason (1760–1830), Revolutionary War soldier, founder of city of Mason, Ohio
Bill Mason (1929–1988), Canadian canoeist and author
William Mason, a pseudonym of William W. Johnstone
Willie Mason (born 1980), Australian rugby league footballer
Willy Mason (born 1984), singer-songwriter
William Mason (Downton Abbey), a fictional character on the series Downton Abbey, played by Thomas Howes
William Mason, director of the Lyric Opera of Chicago

See also
Bill Mason (disambiguation)